A province in Spain is a territorial division defined as a collection of municipalities, although their origin dates back to 1833 with a similar predecessor from 1822 (during the Trienio Liberal) and with roots in the Napoleonic division of Spain into 84 prefectures in 1810. In addition to their political function, provinces are commonly used today as geographical references for example to disambiguate small towns whose names occur frequently throughout Spain. There are many other groupings of municipalities that comprise the local government of Spain. 

The boundaries of provinces can only be altered by the Spanish Parliament, giving rise to the common view that the 17 autonomous communities are subdivided into 50 provinces. In reality the system is not hierarchical but defined according to jurisdiction. 

The body charged with government and administration of a province is the Provincial council, but their existence is controversial (see Provincial council for a discussion). As the province is defined as a "local entity" in the Constitution, the Provincial council belongs to the sphere of local government.

Provincial organization 

The layout of Spain's provinces closely follows the pattern of the territorial division of the country carried out in 1833. The only major change of provincial borders since that time has been the subdivision of the Canary Islands into two provinces rather than one.

Historically, the provinces served mainly as transmission belts for policies enacted in Madrid, as Spain was a highly centralised state for most of its modern history. The importance of the provinces has declined since the adoption of the system of autonomous communities in the period of the Spanish transition to democracy. They nevertheless remain electoral districts for national elections and as geographical references: for instance in postal addresses and telephone codes. National media will also frequently use the province to disambiguate small towns or communities whose names occur frequently throughout Spain.

A small town would normally be identified as being in, say, Valladolid province rather than the autonomous community of Castile and León. The provinces were the "building-blocks" from which the autonomous communities were created. Consequently, no province is divided between more than one of these communities.

Most of the provinces—with the exceptions of Álava, Asturias, Biscay, Cantabria, Gipuzkoa, the Balearic Islands, La Rioja, and Navarre—are named after their principal town. Only two capitals of autonomous communities—Mérida in Extremadura and Santiago de Compostela in Galicia—are not also the capitals of provinces.

Seven of the autonomous communities comprise no more than one province each: Asturias, the Balearic Islands, Cantabria, La Rioja, Madrid, Murcia, and Navarre. These are sometimes referred to as "uniprovincial" communities. Ceuta, Melilla, and the plazas de soberanía are not part of any provinces.

The table below lists the provinces of Spain. For each, the capital city is given, together with an indication of the autonomous community to which it belongs and a link to a list of municipalities in the province. The names of the provinces and their capitals are ordered alphabetically according to the form in which they appear in the main Wikipedia articles describing them. Unless otherwise indicated, their Spanish-language names are the same; locally valid names in Spain's other co-official languages (Basque, Catalan, which is officially called Valencian in the Valencian Community, Galician) are also indicated where they differ.

Provinces

Notes

References

Bibliography

See also 
 Political divisions of Spain
 Local government in Spain
 Autonomous communities of Spain
 Comarcas of Spain
 ISO 3166-2:ES
 List of provincial flags of Spain
 List of Spanish provinces by area
 List of Spanish provinces by population
 Spanish Federation of Municipalities and Provinces

External links 

 Maps of the provinces of Spain
 List of municipalities of Spain listed by province from the Spanish INE (National Statistics Institute) 

 
Spain 2
Provinces
Spain
Spain geography-related lists
Subdivisions of Spain